Cremastosperma is a genus of flowering plants in the family Annonaceae, subfamily Malmeoideae, tribe Malmeae. In 2018 there were 34 recognised species distributed in Central and South America.

Cremastosperma was described by Robert Elias Fries in 1930, based on Aberemoa pedunculata Diels, originally described by Ludwig Diels (1906), which thus became the type species Cremastosperma pedunculatum (Diels) R.E.Fr..

Species of Cremastosperma are found in lowland to pre-montane tropical forest in the Neotropics. The greatest species diversity is distributed in the narrow tropical zone to the west of the Andean mountain chain on the Pacific Ocean side of north-western South America, north into Central America as far as Costa Rica; and on the eastern side of the Andes extending from Colombia through eastern Ecuador and Peru as far south as Bolivia. Two species are found in coastal Venezuela (Cremastosperma macrocarpum Maas and Cremastosperma venezuelanum Pirie), and one in French Guiana (Cremastosperma brevipes (DC.) R.E.Fr.).

Description
Cremastosperma species are small understory trees with typical Annonaceae floral morphology (sepals and petals in whorls of three; indefinite numbers of spirally arranged stamens and carpels) bearing a resemblance to various other Neotropical genera with apocarpous, single-seeded, stipitate fruits (such as Guatteria). The most useful character by which they can be distinguished from these and other similar Neotropical Annonaceae is displayed by the midrib of the leaves, which is raised on the upper side with an unusual, mostly conspicuous, longitudinal groove.

Recognised species:

 Cremastosperma alticola Pirie & Chatrou
 Cremastosperma antioquense Pirie
 Cremastosperma awaense Pirie 
 Cremastosperma brachypodum Pirie & Chatrou
 Cremastosperma brevipes (DC.) R.E.Fr.
 Cremastosperma bullatum Pirie
 Cremastosperma cauliflorum R.E.Fr.
 Cremastosperma cenepense Pirie & Zapata
 Cremastosperma chococola Pirie
 Cremastosperma confusum Pirie
 Cremastosperma dolichocarpum Pirie
 Cremastosperma dolichopodum Pirie & Maas
 Cremastosperma gracilipes R.E.Fr.
 Cremastosperma leiophyllum R.E.Fr.
 Cremastosperma longicuspe R.E.Fr.
 Cremastosperma longipes Pirie
 Cremastosperma macrocarpum Maas
 Cremastosperma magdalenae Pirie
 Cremastosperma megalophyllum R.E.Fr.
 Cremastosperma microcarpum R.E.Fr.
 Cremastosperma monospermum (Rusby) R.E.Fr.
 Cremastosperma napoense Pirie
 Cremastosperma novogranatense R.E.Fr.
 Cremastosperma oblongum R.E.Fr.
 Cremastosperma osicola Pirie & Chatrou
 Cremastosperma pacificum R.E.Fr.
 Cremastosperma panamense Maas
 Cremastosperma pedunculatum (Diels) R.E.Fr.
 Cremastosperma pendulum (Ruiz & Pav.) R.E.Fr.
 Cremastosperma peruvianum R.E.Fr.
 Cremastosperma stenophyllum Pirie
 Cremastosperma venezuelanum Pirie
 Cremastosperma westrae Pirie
 Cremastosperma yamayakatense Pirie

References

 
Annonaceae genera